Hornet Piñata is the third album by American punk rock band, The Didjits, released on July 22, 1990, through Touch and Go Records. There were two music videos produced: Captain Ahab and Sweet Sweet Satan.

Track listing

Accolades

Personnel 
Didjits
Doug Evans – bass guitar, vocals (Foxey Lady only)
Brad Sims – drums
Rick Sims – vocals, guitar
Production and additional personnel
Iain Burgess – production
Didjits – production
David Landis – cover art

References

External links 
 

1990 albums
Albums produced by Iain Burgess
The Didjits albums
Touch and Go Records albums